In mathematics, an Enoki surface is compact complex surface with positive second Betti number that has a global spherical shell and a non-trivial divisor D with H0(O(D)) ≠ 0 and (D, D) = 0.  constructed some examples. They are surfaces of class VII, so are non-Kähler and have Kodaira dimension −∞.

References

Complex surfaces